Farda Khudaverdiyev- (Azerbaijani: Fərda Xudaverdiyev) also known as Farda Amin, is an Azerbaijani actor, comedian and a screenwriter.

Early life 
Farda Akif oglu Khudaverdiyev is originally from Gozagaji village of Siyazan region .  He was born on August 12, 1979 in Jabrayil.  During his studies at the University of Economics, he performed in the "Şən və hazırcavablar klubu".  He was a participant in the program "Tək Səbir" on Space TV, authored and hosted by Hasan Aliyev.  The funny monologue and videos in the program made people laugh a lot.  The director of this program was Farda.  The script was written together with Elmaddin Jafarov.  However, the life of this program is not long.  The individual created the program "Sərbəst FM", and a few years later appeared on the program "Tam Sərbəst Solo".  This program also lasts a short time.  A few years later, in 2007, together with Mushfig Shahverdiyev, the program "Sərbəst FM" was released.  That same year, Mushfig and Farda asked "Niyə?"  is filmed.  Since 2014, he has been the host of the "Top kimi Şou" program.  "Interpapa", "Ögey ata", "Xoxan", "Naxox", "Niyə?"  starred in films such as  "Ögey ata," "Interpapa," "Niyə?"  wrote the screenplays for his films.
The actor married a woman named Gunel in 2010.  He is the father of two sons.

Career 
He began his career on stage with the stand-up comedy acts on the ANS TV station and then resumed as an actor in Azerbaijani Film industry. His most notable works are:
Trace-(Azerbaijani: İz)-2002
Wedding-(Azerbaijani: Toy)-2005- Dashdamir
İnterpapa-2006-Maqsad
Why? (Azerbaijani: Niyə?)-Asiman
Habit-(Azerbaijani: Vərdiş)-2006
Stepfather-(Azerbaijani: Ögey ata)-2013-Karamat
Xoxan-2014 – Raftar
Night guest-(Azerbaijani:Gecə qonağı)-2015-Jamal
The Boys House-(Azerbaijani: Oğlan Evi: Azərbaycansayağı qarət)-2015-Ramin

References

1979 births
Azerbaijani actors
Living people